

Events

June 

 23 June – European Union membership referendum

References

See also 

 2016 in the United Kingdom

2016 in British politics
Political timelines of the 2010s by year
Political timelines of the United Kingdom